The Ford Escort RS Cosworth is a rally version homologation special of the fifth generation European Ford Escort. It was designed to qualify as a Group A car for the World Rally Championship, in which it competed between 1993 and 1998. It was available as a road car from 1992 until 1996 in very limited numbers. The first 2500 cars made before 1 January 1993 are in fact "Homologation special versions." It was instantly recognisable due to its large "whale tail" rear spoiler.

Development

Ford developed the car around the chassis and mechanicals of the Sierra Cosworth, to accommodate the larger Cosworth engine and transmission, while clothing it in Escort body panels to make it resemble the standard Mk 5 Ford Escort, although the front doors and roof are the only bodyshell elements that are actually interchangeable. This accommodation was required as the floor pan of the regular Mk 5 Escort was designed for front-wheel-drive only initially (although a four-wheel drive version, the RS2000 4x4 was soon introduced). Designed under the guidance of Rod Mansfield and John Wheeler of Ford's SVO department, the styling was designed during 1989, a year before the standard Escort was launched, by Stephen Harper at MGA Developments in Coventry. The aerokit (front and rear spoilers) was designed by MGA with oversight by John Wheeler,  whilst the ride and handling was overseen by John Bull and Mick Kelly.  The body tooling was created by coachbuilders Karmann at their facility in Rheine, Germany, where the cars were manufactured.

Changes were made to the engine management system and a new turbocharger was fitted. Permanent four-wheel drive with a 34/66% front/rear split came courtesy of an uprated five-speed gearbox as used in the Sierra Cosworth. Recaro sports seats came as standard. Later production models were available without the oversized tail spoiler although by far the majority were still ordered with it. Like its Sierra predecessor, they are commonly nicknamed "Cossies" by enthusiasts.

The Escort RS Cosworth was a rare car, with 7,145 vehicles produced from the start of production on 19 February 1992 until the last car rolled out of the factory on 12 January 1996. 

A small number were officially imported to the United States by a third party. Now that a number of vehicles are older than 25 years, there are an increasing number that are being imported to the United States.

Two versions were produced. The initial 2,500 units were "homologation specials" used to get the FIA accreditation in Group A and were fitted with an oversized Garrett T3/T04B Hybrid turbo and air/water intercooler (this turbocharger is a hybrid consisting of a Garrett T04B compressor wheel combined with a Garrett T3 turbine and is also known as T34). These units displayed significant turbo lag due to the huge inertia introduced by the T34 unit and the detuned nature of their competition derived engine until 3,500 RPM. From 3,500 RPM when the turbo wakes up the Escort RS Cosworth is reminiscent of a Group B car with the savage entry of the turbo. The first 2500 had a water injection system under the rear passenger seat. This was non-functioning and was in place to demonstrate water injection capability for the FIA inspectors.

The initial cars included features that, although they made the Escort RS Cosworth a more effective car, did not enhance it as a road vehicle, and once the rules were satisfied, Ford attempted to make the car less temperamental and easier to drive under normal conditions, a second version was produced.  This second generation, starting production from late 1994, was fitted with a Garrett T25 turbocharger, a smaller unit which reduced turbo lag and increased usability in everyday driving situations. Performance remained largely unchanged.

Performance

Road variations 
The road going car could be purchased in three variations. Motorsport/Roadsport, Standard and Lux (Luxury).

Most Motorsport cars were Diamond White and lacked electric windows, a radio, sunroof, central locking, fog lamps. Interiors were cloth only.

Standard and Lux cars often had optional extras added at the time of order but generally they included full electrics which the Motorsport model did not. A leather interior upgrade was also optional.

Towards the end of production, the 'whale tail' spoiler could be deleted from the factory. It is unknown how many buyers chose this option.

To celebrate the victory in Monte Carlo in 1994 by Francois Delecour, Ford created the Monte Carlo edition for the UK market. This was available in three colours, Ash Black, Mallard Green and only for this edition, Jewel Violet with an estimated 200 produced total. The differences to a standard car were: 8 x16 OZ Racing Wheels, Monte Carlo stickers on the wings and tailgate, Recaro motorsport 
seats, alloy gear knob and chrome brake handle button. They were otherwise mechanically unchanged.

The Miki Biasion edition was an Italian market only, launched in 1992 with a production run of 120. Each car came with a numbered plaque on the dashboard with Biasion's signature. They were all white, non-sunroof bodies, hexagon trimmed seats, manual windows, no radio and no electric boot release.

The Martini edition was produced to celebrate the partnership between Ford and one of its main sponsors. This edition was limited to 200 models.

The Acropolis edition was an all yellow car with yellow wheels built to celebrate Miki Biasion's victory there in 1993. Only one was built out of a planned 200.

There were a few non-factory editions, most notably an Arrows edition as part of the same Formula 1 teams promotional duties (estimated to be 25 made) by Brooklyn Ford and Wolf editions in Germany where a number of tuning parts could be added such as an additional 'lip' spoiler.

Motorsport
The rationale behind the Escort RS Cosworth's design was that it should win the World Rally Championship. It did not achieve that goal, but it did win eight events between 1993 and 1996 as a Group A car, and two more in World Rally Car guise in 1997-8, before it was replaced by the Focus RS WRC.

The Escort RS Cosworth was developed by the Ford works rally team during 1991 and 1992. Its first appearances, prior to homologation, were in the Spanish championship, in the hands of Jose Maria Bardolet, and on the 1992 Scottish Rally, where it was driven by Malcolm Wilson, who was also the lead development driver. Wilson was not formally competing in the event, but his stage times were faster than those of winner Colin McRae. During the latter part of the 1992 season, development of the Sierra Cosworth came to an end, and the works team drivers Francois Delecour and Miki Biasion concentrated on readying the Escort for competition.

On the Escort's first outing at World Championship level, the 1993 Monte Carlo Rally, Delecour took the lead with Biasion second. The pair led the event until the final night, when a late charge by Didier Auriol, driving a Toyota Celica, saw him win, with the Fords second and third.  Nevertheless, the new car had demonstrated its potential, which was underlined the following month when Malcolm Wilson, driving a car prepared by his own team, briefly led the Swedish Rally before retiring after an accident. The works team returned for the Portuguese Rally: Delecour led almost from the start and won the event with Biasion second, establishing both car and driver as serious contenders for that year's World Championship. Delecour won again in Corsica, and Biasion in Greece – his first win for three years – putting them first and second in the drivers' championship, and Ford in the joint lead in the manufacturers' title.  During the second half of the season Toyota driver Juha Kankkunen won in Argentina, Finland and Australia, but in New Zealand, with the exception of Delecour's second place (behind Colin McRae) the Fords' results were relatively poor, giving Toyota the manufacturers' title. Both works Escorts retired on the San Remo Rally, Delecour's after an accident and Biasion's with engine failure after a radiator hose split, but the event was won by Italian Franco Cunico, in a privately entered Escort RS Cosworth. It was the first time in several years that a privateer had won at this level, and in doing so he outpaced the works Lancia Delta Integrale of reigning World Champion Carlos Sainz, demonstrating the superiority of the Escort over the previously dominant Lancia.  Nevertheless, the result was a disappointment for Ford since, although Delecour won the penultimate round of the season, in Catalunya, he lost the world title to Kankkunen.

Delecour and Ford were tipped as serious contenders for the 1994 World Championship, especially after Delecour's victory on the Monte Carlo Rally. However, Delecour retired from the second round of the championship, in Portugal, with engine failure, and a few weeks later was injured in a road accident, which forced him to miss the next four rounds. Biasion finished third in Portugal, but he was unable to keep up with the Toyotas, and his results did not improve thereafter, amid reports that his relationship with the team was deteriorating. He left at the end of 1994, and did not drive again at World Championship level. In Delecour's absence the second Escort was driven by a succession of temporary drivers, including 1981 World Champion Ari Vatanen, young Belgian driver Bruno Thiry and Franco Cunico. With the exception of Vatanen's third place in Argentina (followed by retirement after a major crash in New Zealand while challenging for third), results were indifferent and the team faced some criticism for its dependence upon Delecour.  The final guest driver proved a greater success, however: on a one-off drive for the team, Tommi Mäkinen won the 1994 1000 Lakes Rally. Delecour returned to the team on the same event but was still not fully fit and finished fourth, before retiring on the final two rounds.  Thiry rounded off a disappointing season for the team by taking third place on the final round, in Great Britain.

The Ford works team closed at the end of 1994, and the rally programme was handed over to the Belgian RAS Sport team. Biasion was replaced by Bruno Thiry, while Delecour stayed with the team. The season was shortened to eight events and servicing was much more restricted than in previous seasons. Group A cars also had to run with a smaller turbo restrictor than previously, which was a particular handicap for Ford, since the rally Escort's seven-speed gearbox was not well suited to a lower-revving engine. Delecour, although complaining volubly in interviews about the rule changes, finished second on the Monte Carlo. Bruno Thiry then led the Corsica Rally and looked likely to win, until a wheel bearing failure, which under previous rules his mechanics would have been able to rectify, put him out of the rally. Delecour finished second, but there were no further top-three placings that season and Ford finished at the bottom of the manufacturers' championship.

The experiment with RAS not having been successful, Ford took its rally team back in-house for the 1996 season. Thiry stayed as second driver, but Delecour left the team and was replaced by Carlos Sainz. Sainz took third place in the driver's championship, with a win in Indonesia and second in Sweden and Italy. Nevertheless, the Escort was by this time outclassed by the Mitsubishi and Tommi Mäkinen, who won that year's title, and towards the end of the season interest switched towards the following season and the incoming World Rally Car rules.

Although it required some special dispensation, Ford were allowed to adapt the Cosworth into a World Rally Car, to serve as a stopgap until a purpose-built WRC was developed. The semi-trailing-arm rear suspension, judged one of the Cosworth's weak points, was replaced with MacPherson struts, and modifications were made to the bodywork and transmission. The rally cars were to be run by Malcolm Wilson's team, now known as M-Sport. During the 1997 and 1998 seasons, it went on to score two more victories by Carlos Sainz. With Thiry, Ari Vatanen (on a one-off podium-scoring basis at the Safari Rally after Thiry suffered an injury) and four-time World Rally Champion Juha Kankkunen now behind the wheel of the cars, the Escort name finally bowed out of works rallying altogether after a double-podium at the season-ending 1998 Rally of Great Britain.

Outside the World Championship, the Escort RS Cosworth, like its predecessors, was highly successful at national and European championship level, winning many national rally titles. These titles include: Belgian (1993, 1994, 1996), British (1994), Italian (1994, 1995, 1996), German (1993, 1994), French (1993, 1994, 1995), Netherlands (1993, 1994), Austrian (1994, 1995), Greek (1994), Bulgarian (1995, 1996), Turkey (1994, 1995, 1996), Swiss (1995), Denmark (1995), Finland (1995), Irish (1995), Portuguese (1994, 1995, 1996), Czech Republic (1996), Lithuanian (1997), Slovenian (1996, 1997, 1998, 2002) and in 1994 Belgian driver Patrick Snijers won the European Rally Championship driving a RAS Sport prepared car. It was also a successful Group N contender. Tuning parts were (and are) readily available, and lower-specification Escort RS Cosworth's became a common feature on even relatively low-level rallies in Europe during the 1990s.

In recent times, Escort RS Cosworth's of all varieties (Group A, N and WRC) are regularly seen at historic rally events and festivals. Ken Block also added two to his fleet for stage rallies and Gymkhana 10. Unfortunately, due to a gearbox issue, one of the cars crashed and was destroyed in a fire. As part of the Cossie World Tour 2019, his second car was upgraded to a modern specification which included wider wheel arches to accommodate a much wider track. 

The Escort also had a foray in Formula One albeit as its Safety Car. It was, in fact, used during two Grands Prix in the 1992 season to trial this new safety concept, which was officially introduced in the sport the following year (using other road cars).

WRC Victories
{|class="wikitable" style="font-size: 95%; "
! No.
! Event
! Season
! Driver
! Co-driver
! Car
|-
| 1
|  Rallye de Portugal
| 1993
|  François Delecour
|  Daniel Grataloup
| Ford Escort RS Cosworth
|-
| 2
|  Tour de Corse
| 1993
|  François Delecour
|  Daniel Grataloup
| Ford Escort RS Cosworth
|-
| 3
|  Acropolis Rally
| 1993
|  Miki Biasion
|  Tiziano Siviero
| Ford Escort RS Cosworth
|-
| 4
|  Rallye Sanremo
| 1993
|  Franco Cunico
|  Stefano Evangelisti
| Ford Escort RS Cosworth
|-
| 5
|  Rally Catalunya
| 1993
|  François Delecour
|  Daniel Grataloup
| Ford Escort RS Cosworth
|-
| 6
|  Monte Carlo Rally
| 1994
|  François Delecour
|  Daniel Grataloup
| Ford Escort RS Cosworth
|-
| 7
|  1000 Lakes Rally
| 1994
|  Tommi Mäkinen
|  Seppo Harjanne
| Ford Escort RS Cosworth
|-
| 8
|  Rally Indonesia
| 1996
|  Carlos Sainz
|  Luis Moya
| Ford Escort RS Cosworth
|-
| 9
|  Acropolis Rally
| 1997
|  Carlos Sainz
|  Luis Moya
| Ford Escort WRC
|-
| 10
|  Rally Indonesia
| 1997
|  Carlos Sainz
|  Luis Moya
| Ford Escort WRC
|-
|}

Overall Winner in the W2L Series

{|class="wikitable" style="font-size: 95%; "
! No.
! Event
! Season
! Driver
! Co-driver
! Car
|-
| 1
|  Monte Carlo Rally
| 1996
|  Patrick Bernardini
|  Bernard Occelli
| Ford Escort RS Cosworth
|-
|}

References

External links

Escort RS Cosworth
Hot hatches
Sport compact cars
All-wheel-drive vehicles